Yambah station is a pastoral lease that operates as a cattle station in the Northern Territory of Australia.

Location
In 1940 four blocks were selected and  subdivided from 17 choices in Bond Springs.

Description
It is composed of typical rangeland grazing country that is either open or lightly timbered and has a variety of native grasses, herbage and introduced buffel giving good overall coverage. It was stocked with a herd of approximately 4,800 head of cattle in 2018.

History
In 2018 the property was up for sale; the owners were Aaron and Karina Gorey, whose family have owned the property over three generations since the 1940s.

See also
List of ranches and stations

References

Farms in Australia
Buildings and structures in Alice Springs
Stations (Australian agriculture)
Pastoral leases in the Northern Territory